Similosodus torui is a species of beetle in the family Cerambycidae. It was described by Holzschuh in 1989.

References

torui
Beetles described in 1989